Cyperus sieberianus is a species of sedge that is native to parts of the Cape Verde.

See also 
 List of Cyperus species

References 

sieberianus
Plants described in 1827
Flora of Cape Verde
Taxa named by Kurt Polycarp Joachim Sprengel